Edward Kemeys (January 31, 1843 – May 11, 1907) was an American sculptor and considered America's first animalier.

He is best known for his sculptures of animals, particularly the two bronze lions that mark the entrance to the Art Institute of Chicago Building in Chicago Illinois. Kemeys was also a captain in the 4th United States Colored Heavy Artillery, Company H, writer, lecturer, and adventurer in the Western United States.

Life
Kemeys was born on January 31, 1843, in Savannah, Georgia. to Abby Greene of Providence, Rhode Island, and William Kemeys of Scarborough, New York. The Kemeys family lived in Savannah, GA, moving back to New York after the death of his mother in 1843. Kemeys first worked in the iron business of New York City at age seventeen.

Civil War

When the Civil War broke out, Kemeys enlisted. He was 19. Kemeys volunteered for the 65th Volunteer Regiment of the State of New York. "I served in the Peninsula campaign till I fell sick of fever and was discharged. I went in again later as a second lieutenant." Kemeys re-enlisted as a commissioned officer in the 4th United States Colored Heavy Artillery, Company H attaining the rank of captain. He resigned his commission in 1866.

After the Civil War
He studied in New York City and then Paris.  In Paris, he was impressed by the style of Antoine-Louis Barye, although in no sense an imitator. He made a specialty of the wild animals of the American continent. His “Fight between Buffalo and Wolves” attracted much attention at the Paris Salon in 1878. Among his other important works are “Panther and Deer,” and “Coyote and Raven.” A colossal head of a buffalo for the facade of the station of the Pacific railroad at St. Louis, Missouri, which was cast in bronze in New York in August, 1887, was the largest work of its kind that had been done in the United States. Another bronze statue of a panther named "Still Hunt," is permanently situated on a rock flanking the East Drive of New York City's Central Park.

Kemeys died in Washington, D.C., on May 11, 1907. He and his wife, Laura Kemeys, are buried in Arlington National Cemetery.

Gallery

References

Furth reading

External links

Bronze Gallery biography
Smithsonian American Art Museum

1843 births
1907 deaths
People from Savannah, Georgia
Artists from Georgia (U.S. state)
Animal artists
19th-century American sculptors
19th-century American painters
19th-century male artists
20th-century American painters
20th-century American sculptors
20th-century male artists